An overview of South African military decorations and medals, which form part of the South African honours system.

Colonial forces 1894–1913

The colonial military forces received British military decorations in wartime. From 1894, the colonial governments awarded medals for distinguished conduct and for long service. This was the general practice in the British Empire at that time. The colonial medals were:

 Decorations
 Volunteer Officers' Decoration (VD) (18941901)
 Colonial Auxiliary Forces Officers' Decoration (VD) (190013)
 Distinguished Conduct Medal (18941913)
 Distinguished Conduct Medal (Natal) 18941913)
 Distinguished Conduct Medal (Cape of Good Hope) (18941913)
 Distinguished Conduct Medal (Transvaal) (19021913)
 Campaign medals
 Cape of Good Hope General Service Medal (1900)
 Natal Native Rebellion Medal (1907)
 Long service medals
 Meritorious Service Medal (18451913)
 Meritorious Service Medal (Cape of Good Hope) (18961913)
 Meritorious Service Medal (Natal) (18961913)
 Army Long Service and Good Conduct Medal (18301896)
 Army Long Service and Good Conduct Medal (Cape of Good Hope) (18961910)
 Army Long Service and Good Conduct Medal (Natal) (18961910)
 Permanent Forces of the Empire Beyond the Seas Medal (19101913)
 Volunteer Long Service Medal for India and the Colonies (18961901)
 Colonial Auxiliary Forces Long Service Medal (190013).

Union Defence Forces 1913–1952

The colonial forces were replaced in 1912 by the Union Defence Forces, which continued the system. British decorations for gallantry and distinguished service were awarded during World War I and World War II, and the South African government granted the other categories of award. They were:

 Decoration
 Distinguished Conduct Medal (191440)
 Campaign medals
 Victory Medal (1919)
 Africa Service Medal (1943)
 Long service medals
 Permanent Forces of the Empire Beyond the Seas Medal (19131930)
 Medal for Long Service and Good Conduct (Military) (193039)
 Medal for Long Service and Good Conduct (South Africa) (193952)
 Meritorious Service Medal (191440)
 Colonial Auxiliary Forces Officers' Decoration (VD) (191339)
 Colonial Auxiliary Forces Long Service Medal (191339)
 Efficiency Decoration (ED) (193952)
 Efficiency Medal (193952)
 RNVR Volunteer Officers' Decoration (VD) (191549).medal
 RNVR Long Service & Good Conduct Medal (191549)
 Air Efficiency Award (195052).

Boer war veterans

In 1920, the South African government instituted a separate set of awards, for Boer veterans of the 18991902 Anglo-Boer War — neither of the Boer republics for which they had fought had had its own honours system. The awards were:

 Decoration
 Dekoratie voor Trouwe Dienst (Decoration for Devoted Service) (DTD)
 Campaign medals
 South African Republic & Orange Free State War Medal
 Wounds Ribbon.

South African Defence Force

19521975

South Africa introduced its own honours system in 1952. Its largest component was a series of military decorations and medals, which not only replaced the existing long service medals, but provided substitutes for the decorations which the British government had awarded in wartime:

19752003

A new system was introduced in 1975. It retained seven of the existing decorations and medals. Innovations included a hierarchy of merit awards, cumulative long service medals, and colour-coded ribbons. As the South African Defence Force was engaged in military operations in South West Africa and Angola throughout the 1970s and 1980s, the number of awards granted each year increased significantly. Additional decorations were instituted between 1987 and 1991.

Armed opposition organisations

In 1996, two separate sets of decorations were instituted for veterans who had served in the Azanian People's Liberation Army and Umkhonto we Sizwe during the armed campaign against the former government.

Azanian People's Liberation Army

Umkhonto we Sizwe

South African National Defence Force

The South African National Defence Force, which was formed in 1994 by amalgamating the SADF, the liberation armies, and the military forces of the former homelands, used the SADF decorations and medals until 2003, when a new series of decorations was instituted:

Bravery
 
 
 
 Superior Service
 
 
 
 Campaign medal
 
 Commemoration Medal
 
 Long service medal
 
 
 
 
 Emblems
 
 
 
 Bars and Clasps
 Maluti Clasp (Operation Boleas)

See also

 Orders, decorations, and medals of South Africa
 British and Commonwealth orders and decorations
 South African civil honours
 South African intelligence service decorations
 South African orders and decorations
 South African police decorations
 South African prisons decorations

References

Further reading

Alexander, E. G. M., Barron G. K. B. and Bateman, A. J. (1986).  South African Orders, Decorations and Medals. Human and Rousseau.
Monick, S. (1988).  South African Military Awards 1912–1987. South African National Museum of Military History.
Matthysen, P. P. (2009).  A Guide to South African Military Awards. Marc Norman Publishing.

External links
 SANDF website
  South African Medals Website
 Order of Precedence 2005

0
South Africa and the Commonwealth of Nations